Roald Dahl Plass is a public space in Cardiff Bay, Cardiff, Wales. It is named after Cardiff-born author Roald Dahl, and is located on the coast along the south of the city centre. The square is home to the Senedd building housing the Senedd, the Welsh parliament, and the Wales Millennium Centre, a performing arts centre. The bowl-like shape of the space has made it a popular amphitheatre for hosting open-air concerts.

Formerly named the Oval Basin and known as the Bowl, the area was one of the docks for a thriving coal port during the latter half the 19th century and much of the 20th century. Following World War II, the space entered a period of decay and dereliction until the 1980s, when the Cardiff Bay area was regenerated.

The name is a nod to the writer's roots (both of Dahl's parents were from Norway) and to the Norwegian seafarers' church which stands nearby. "Plass" is the Norwegian cognate of the English word "place;" in this context the word means square.

History

The area was originally all wetlands owned by John Crichton-Stuart, 2nd Marquess of Bute. He was persuaded to finance construction of the dock on his land at a cost of over £ 350,000. The dock opened under the name "West Bute Dock" on 8 October 1839, and was over 1400 yards (1280 m) long and 200 feet (60 m) wide, allowing 300 vessels to berth at any time.

The dock was joined by four others: East Bute Dock, Roath Basin, Roath Dock and Queen Alexandra Dock. Cardiff had become the largest exporter of coal in the world; in 1913, Cardiff exported 10,700,000 tonnes of coal. However, the Great Depression, Second World War and cheap foreign competition all caused massive damage to the Welsh coal mining industry, with the last coal export through the dock taking place in 1964. The dock was filled in to prevent collapse of the surrounding walls.

Design features

Oval Basin
 

What was known as the Oval Basin was designed by artist William Pye, in conjunction with Nicholas Hare Architects and it opened in April 2000. A plaque was unveiled 13 July 2002 to commemorate the rename of the Oval Basin to Roald Dahl Plass.

Roald Dahl Plass is today an oval shaped open space surrounded by illuminated pillars and a gravel covering over the original dock area. The Plass was a central part of Cardiff's bid for European Capital of Culture status for 2008, although it ultimately lost the bid to Liverpool.

Water Tower

The tower was also designed by Nicholas Hare Architects in conjunction with the sculptor, William Pye.

The tower has also become known as the "Torchwood Tower" (with postcards published using that name), because it marked the location and entrance of the fictitious Torchwood Hub of the BBC television Doctor Who spin-off series Torchwood.

Doctor Who and Torchwood

Roald Dahl Plass first appears in "Boom Town", an episode of the long running, sci-fi drama Doctor Who. In the show's universe, a "spatial-temporal" rift runs through Cardiff, a feature that the ninth Doctor uses as a fueling station for his TARDIS. The plaza later appears in Doctor Who'''s spin-off series Torchwood. The fictional Torchwood Institute has one of its headquarters, Torchwood Three, based under the square, to monitor alien activity through the rift. The Water Tower has prominently featured in both of the BBC Wales flagship shows. The base of the fountain can be seen passing through the building, and one of the paving tiles in the square is a decoy which hides an "invisible lift" leading down to the base. This base was effectively destroyed in Torchwood: Children of Earth but the Plass was seen for a brief moment at the end of the first episode of Miracle Day.''

Festivals and events
Roald Dahl Plass is often used to host concerts and other cultural events, such as the Cardiff Food Festival. In August 2018 it was central to the 'no fence' National Eisteddfod, with stalls and an open-air music stage. The Gorsedd Ceremony took place in the square on the Monday and the Friday.

See also
List of public art in Cardiff

References

External links
 
Roald Dahl Plass on Google Maps

2000 establishments in the United Kingdom
Squares in Cardiff
Redevelopment projects in Cardiff
Plass